Veniana Tuibulia is a Fijian athlete who competed in judo.

She won a bronze medal in the 2003 Oceania Judo Championship, in the category of -52 kg.

International Medals

References 

Living people
Fijian female judoka
Year of birth missing (living people)